Nísia Trindade Lima (born 17 January 1958 in Rio de Janeiro) is a Brazilian social scientist, sociologist, researcher and university professor. She had served as chairwoman of Oswaldo Cruz Foundation from 2017 to 2023. Trindade is the incumbent Minister of Health of Brazil.

Biography
Nísia was born in Rio de Janeiro in 1958, raised in the neighbourhood of Flamengo. She is daughter of Nivaldo de Assis Lima, responsible for telling her the first stories about Brazil, about literature and her potential for social transforming. Inspired by her high school sociology teacher, Nisia attended the Social Sciences School of Rio de Janeiro State University (UERJ), in 1976.

During her university studies, she joined a pro-democracy student movement and was part of the construction of the Human Sciences academic center of the university. After graduation, Trindade began teaching in state and municipal public school of Rio. In 1982, she began her studies for Master of Political Science at the Researches University Institute of Rio de Janeiro (IUPERJ), current Institute of Social and Political Studies (IESP), with the thesis "O Movimento de Favelados do Rio de Janeiro: Políticas do Estado e Lutas Sociais".

During the elaboration of her thesis, she joined Casa de Oswaldo Cruz (COC) as researcher. In 1992, she began her studies for a doctor degree, also at IUPERJ. In 1997, she defended the thesis "Um sertão chamado Brasil: intelectuais, sertanejos e imaginação social", won the Best Doctor of Sociology Thesis of IUPERJ and it was published on book by the institution's publisher, with a second edition published by Hucitec in 2013.

She was head of the research deparment of COC (1989–1991), deputy director (1992–1994) and director between 1998 and 2005. Trindade was member of the elaboration team of Museu da Vida project, opened in 1999. In 2000, she received the Medal of Centenary of Oswaldo Cruz Foundation (Fiocruz). As COC director, she created the Post-graduation Program in Sciences and Health History (PPGHCS) in 2000.

In December 2020, she was elected member of the Brazilian Academy of Sciences (ABC) in the category Social Sciences. On 1 January 2022, she became member of the The World Academy of Sciences (TWAS) for the advance of science in developing countries.

Academic career
As productivity researcher of higher education of the National Council for Scientific and Technological Development (CNPq), Nísia is recognized for her scientific production and for her actions to improve the dialogue between science and society. She is a reference in the Brazilian social thinking, sciences history and public health areas. She taught and oriented students from all education levels, from lower education to post-doctorate, as professor at UERJ and Fiocruz. Trindade is the author of dozens of articles, books and chapters with reflections about the dilemmas of the national society, specially the division between urban and rural Brazil. In the field of social sciences, she contributes through many different initiatives for the strengthening of actions of research and teaching. One of her accomplishments was the creation of the Social Thinking Virtual Library (BVPS), in collaboration with the Federal University of Rio de Janeiro (UFRJ) and institutions networks.

Chairperson of Fiocruz
First woman as chairperson of Oswaldo Cruz Foundation in 120 of history, she assumed office on 4 January 2017 as the most voted in the internal election. During her term, she was compromised with the expansion of Fiocruz role in the global health community. She participated in many programs and international networks in areas of Science History and Health History. Nísia coordinated the Zika Social Sciences Network, which is part of Zika Alliance Network, a multination and multidisciplinary research group formed by 54 members from all over the world. She was member of the work group of the World Health Organization Global Action Plan, which goal is to optimize the global research for the countries' health systems, and of the WHO consultant group for the implementation of the 2030 Agenda. Nísia was member of the International Director Committee to oversee and facilitate the implementation of the Nairobi Summit on CIPD25 and assumed the co-presidency of the UNSDSN Health for All Network in 2019.

COVID-19 pandemic
During her tenure, she leaded Fiocruz action in the fight against the COVID-19 pandemic in Brazil. Some of the initiatives are: creation of a new Hospital Center in Manguinhos campus; coordination in the country of the Solidarity clinical trial of the World Health Organization; increase of the national capacity of production of diagnostic kits and processing of tests results; organization of emergency actions to the vulnerable population; offer of virtual classes for professionals of the Unified Health System (SUS) of clinical magament and hospital attention for COVID-19 patients; launch of a biosecurity guide in schools and Fiocruz became a reference laboratory for WHO in COVID-19 in the Americas.

She was responsible for the creation of COVID-19 Observatory, a transdisciplinary network which searches and systematizes epidemiological data; monitors and publishes informations to subside public politics about the spread of the new coronavirus and its social impacts in different regions of Brazil.

Nísia coordinated the deal of technological order in articulation with the Ministry of Health, the Oxford University, the pharmaceutic company AstraZeneca and local production units for clinical tests, sanitary registration and production of million of doses of the Oxford–AstraZeneca COVID-19 vaccine in Brazil.

On 11 January 2021, Nísia was reelected as chairwoman of Fiocruz, after she received 87% of the valid votes in the internal election.

On 1 September 2021, she received the Knight degree of the National Order of the Legion of Honour (Ordre National de la Légion d'Honneur) of France, recognizing her actions as chair of the Foundation in the areas of science and health, specially the institution actions in the fight against the COVID-19 pandemic.

Ministry of Health
On 22 December 2022, she was announced by president-elect Luiz Inácio Lula da Silva as Minister of Health, assuming office on 1 January 2023. Nísia is the first woman to head the Ministry. The choice was praised by WHO director-general Tedros Adhanom Ghebreyesus, both in press conference and in his personal Twitter account.

References

External links
 
 

|-

1958 births
Living people
People from Rio de Janeiro (city)
Government ministers of Brazil
Rio de Janeiro State University alumni
Chevaliers of the Légion d'honneur
Brazilian women scientists
Academic staff of the Rio de Janeiro State University
Health ministers of Brazil